The 2013 Moldovan Super Cup was the seventh Moldovan Super Cup, an annual Moldovan football match played by the winner of the national football league (the National Division) and the winner of the national Cup. The match was played between Sheriff Tiraspol, champions of the 2012–13 National Division, and Tiraspol, winners of the 2012–13 Moldovan Cup. It was held at the Sheriff Stadium on 29 June 2013.

Sheriff Tiraspol won the match 2–0.

Match

References

2013–14 in Moldovan football
FC Tiraspol matches
FC Sheriff Tiraspol matches
Moldovan Super Cup